Stanislas Naulin (27 April 1870 – 3 November 1932) was a French general.

He commanded the 19th Army Corps (France) after the First World War.

References

1870 births
1932 deaths
French generals